Lea Bošković (born 22 September 1999) is a Croatian tennis player.

She has career-high WTA rankings of 244 in singles and 215 in doubles. Bošković has won six singles and eight doubles titles on the ITF Circuit.

On the ITF Junior Circuit, she had a career-high combined ranking of 19, achieved on 5 June 2017. In 2017, she reached the US Open girls' doubles final, partnering Wang Xiyu.

Bošković made her Fed Cup debut for Croatia in 2018, and has a win–loss record of 3–3.

Grand Slam singles performance timeline

Singles

ITF Circuit finals

Singles: 13 (6 titles, 7 runner–ups)

Doubles: 15 (8 titles, 7 runner-ups)

Junior Grand Slam finals

Girls' doubles: 1 (runner-up)

Fed Cup participation

Singles (3–3)

References

External links
 
 
 

1999 births
Living people
Croatian female tennis players
Tennis players from Zagreb
21st-century Croatian women